Rafael Lesmes Bobed (9 November 1926 – 8 October 2012) was a Spanish footballer who played as a defender.

Club career
Lesmes was born in Ceuta. Over 12 La Liga seasons, he played for Real Valladolid (two spells) and Real Madrid, appearing in 263 games in the competition. He began his career with local Atlético Tetuán, and retired in 1962 at the age of 35.

With Real Madrid, Lesmes was part of the team that won five consecutive European Cups.

International career
Lesmes was selected for Spain's 1950 FIFA World Cup squad as an uncapped member. He would have to wait nearly five years to make his debut, however, appearing in a 1–2 friendly loss to France on 17 March 1955, in Madrid.

Lesmes' second and last international was a 6–2 win against Northern Ireland on 15 October 1958, in another exhibition game.

Personal life and death
Lesmes' older brother, Francisco, was also a footballer and a defender. Often referred to as Lesmes I as he shared teams with his sibling for four seasons, he spent his entire professional career with Valladolid, also being a Spanish international.

Rafael died in Valladolid on 8 October 2012, one month shy of his 86th birthday.

Honours
Real Madrid 
La Liga: 1953–54, 1954–55, 1956–57, 1957–58
European Cup: 1955–56, 1956–57, 1957–58, 1958–59, 1959–60
Latin Cup: 1955, 1957

References

External links

1926 births
2012 deaths
People from Ceuta
Spanish footballers
Footballers from Ceuta
Association football defenders
La Liga players
Segunda División players
Tercera División players
Atlético Tetuán footballers
Real Valladolid players
Atlético Madrid footballers
Real Madrid CF players
UEFA Champions League winning players
Spain international footballers
1950 FIFA World Cup players